Utricularia furcellata is a small annual carnivorous plant that belongs to the genus Utricularia. It is native to northeast India and Thailand, suggesting that it may also occur in suitable habitats in the regions in between. It was originally described by Daniel Oliver in 1859.

See also 
 List of Utricularia species

References 

furcellata
Flora of East Himalaya
Flora of Assam (region)
Carnivorous plants of Asia
Plants described in 1859
Taxa named by Daniel Oliver